The  Burmese myna (Acridotheres burmannicus) is a species of starling in the family Sturnidae.
It is found in Myanmar.

References

Acridotheres
Birds described in 1862
Birds of Myanmar
Taxa named by Thomas C. Jerdon
Taxonomy articles created by Polbot